KSCY (106.9 FM) is a radio station broadcasting in the Bozeman, Montana area. It is licensed to serve Four Corners, Montana. The owner is Silver Star Communications, Inc.  The station is more commonly known as K-SKY Country, featuring today's hottest country hits and biggest country stars and 20 in-a-row.

KSCY broadcasts a new country music format. Studios, along with KBZM and KKQX, are at 8274 Huffine Lane, west of Bozeman, near Four Corners. Its transmitter site is off Highway 84, southwest of Four Corners. It has been granted a U.S. Federal Communications Commission construction permit to increase ERP to 12,000 watts.

External links

FCC construction permit

SCY
Country radio stations in the United States
Radio stations established in 2008